Maternal care may refer to:

in humans:
Obstetrics, medical specialty concerning pregnancy and childbirth
Midwifery, healthcare provided during and following pregnancy
 Postpartum care, healthcare provided to a mother following birth
 Maternal sensitivity, a woman's attention to her infant
in other animals:
 Parental care of offspring provided by female organisms
 Maternal investment, female strategies in evolutionary biology

See also
Paternal care, care provided by male parents
Parenting
Maternity hospital
Maternity (disambiguation)